Moses Uri ben Yoseph HaLevi, also Moses Uri Levi or Moses Uri Halewi (הרב משה אורי הלוי in Hebrew; born around 1543 in Braunschweig; died 1621/25, presumably in Amsterdam) was originally a German rabbi who become an instrumental figure and a key founder of the Spanish-Portuguese community of Amsterdam. Born likely in the German city of Wittmund, Germany or Braunschweig, in the year 1602 he became the first chief rabbi of the Jewish Community of Amsterdam. He is considered to be the founder of the first Jewish community in Amsterdam and the first rabbi of a Sephardic community in Northern Europe.

Biography 

Moses Uri ha-Levi was a son of Joseph ben Ephraim ha-Levi from Braunschweig. He probably had to flee his hometown in 1557 when the Jews were expelled. He settled in the East Frisian Emden. Jews had settled there for several years because the Count of East Friesland had placed them under their special protection; Uri ha-Levi is the first Emden Jew whose name has been passed down. Various variants of his name are known, such as Feibisch Emden in Jewish sources as the Yiddish equivalent of the Hebrew name Uri or in Dutch Philips Joost. The first name Moses is not documented during his lifetime.

Uri ha-Levi lived in Emden for around 40 years. According to his own statements, he officiated from around 1570 to 1601 as a teacher and rabbi for the small Ashkenazi Jewish community there and apparently had a network of contacts in Europe. In 1598 he was arrested as an exposed member of the community with two other Jewish men by the Emden council, but was released on the basis of a petition from the Prague and Bohemian Jewish elders to Emperor Rudolf II. Despite the benevolence of Count Enno III, who profited economically from the trading activities of the Jews, the citizens and clergy demanded their expulsion.

According to a tradition that is also the founding legend of the Amsterdam Jewish community, in 1601 a group of Marranos under the leadership of Jacob Tirado reached Emden by ship. The ship that came from London is said to have been driven off by a storm. They came from families who, as descendants of forced converts, were aloof from Christianity, but had little knowledge of the Jewish religion of their forefathers. A Hebrew inscription made them aware of the home of Moses Uri ha-Levi and went to see him. When they found out that he was indeed a Jew, they asked him to teach them about Judaism. Ha-Levi had suggested that they go to Amsterdam together because they could freely practice their religion there. According to other sources, this initiative is said to have come from Uri's son Aaron, who - unlike his father, who only spoke German - was able to communicate with the Marranos in Spanish. These supposed events were described by the grandson of Moses and Aaron's son, the printer Uri Phoebus ha-Levi, in his 1711 book Narração da vinda dos judeos espanhoes a Amsterdam. Contrary to this report, there is the assumption that the establishment of contact was different, since Uri ha-Levi's son Joseph is said to have traded with Marranas as early as 1598 and established connections.

Just a few weeks after their arrival in Calvinist Amsterdam, Moses ha-Levi and his son Aaron are said to have been arrested. The reason for the arrest was the suspicion that masses were being held in Latin in their home, which is why it was assumed that they were Spanish Catholics hated in the Netherlands. Both men were released shortly after they had declared that they were Jews. According to other information, ha-Levi was imprisoned again because he earned his money as a fence, pawnbroker and circumciser, which he was able to refute.

The first group of Marranos was followed by others from Portugal to Amsterdam; the wealthy Jews who traded across Europe were welcome in the impoverished Netherlands. They rented a house in Amsterdam, where they were evidently instructed by ha-Levi, who, however, did not necessarily have to be aware of the differences between the various rites. It is believed that Uri ha-Levi was in the possession of the (Sephardic) Amsterdam Machsor and on whose basis he introduced the Marranos to Jewish rites; this manuscript is said to have passed on to his grandson Moses later. In 1603 the Portuguese community Beth Jaacob was founded: "Historically remarkable is [...] the fact that he [Moses Uri ha-Levi], as Ashkenazi, built up a Sephardic community."

Uri ha-Levi circumcised the Marranos and was a rabbi and ritual slaughterer himself to provide the community with kosher meat; his son Aaron acted as a chazzan. Both are said to have performed a total of around 2500 circumcisions. Despite all these activities, the ha-Levi family were among the poorer in the community and were dependent on donations from the richer Sephardi. The Ashkenazi descendants of ha-Levi retained special rights within the Sephardic community for around 100 years. These special rights could have given rise to a dispute between the grandson Uri Phoebus ha-Levi and the community, after which he gave the Amsterdam Machsor as a gift to the Sephardic community in 1669.

In addition to Aaron and Joseph, two other children are recorded for Uri ha-Levi, a daughter of unknown name, and Jacob, the progenitor of a Jacobson family in Hamburg.

References

article in Jewish encyclopedia

1544 births
1622 deaths
Levites
German Ashkenazi Jews
Rabbis from Amsterdam
Clergy from Amsterdam
People from Wittmund